Exim Bank (Uganda) (EBU), commonly known as Exim Bank, is a commercial bank in Uganda. It is one of the commercial banks licensed by the Bank of Uganda (BOU), the central bank and national banking regulator. EBU is a member of the Exim Bank Group (East Africa), a large financial services conglomerate with subsidiaries in Tanzania, Comoros, Uganda and Djibouti. The group also maintains a representative office in Ethiopia.

Overview
This bank provides services to both individuals and corporate clients. As of December 2019, the bank's total assets were valued at approximately UGX 341.2 billion (approx. US$90.907 million).
At that time, the bank's customer deposits were UGX 275.6 billion (approx. US$73.429 million).

History
Exim Bank Uganda was established in 2011 as Imperial Bank Uganda by two major investors, Mukwano Group, a diversified Ugandan business and manufacturing  conglomerate, and Imperial Bank Kenya, a medium-sized financial services provider, based in Nairobi, Kenya.

On 13 October 2015, following the death of the Imperial Bank Group's managing director, the Central Bank of Kenya placed Imperial Bank Kenya under statutory management due to "unsafe and unsound business conditions to transact business" at the parent company. BOU took over Imperial Bank Uganda the same day. BOU promptly put the Imperial Bank Group's shareholding on sale. On 7 March 2016, Exim Bank (Tanzania) acquired the ownership interest that Imperial Bank Kenya formerly had in this bank and re-branded it to Exim Bank (Uganda).

Ownership
The stock of the bank is privately held. The detailed shareholding in Exim Bank (Uganda) as of March 2016 is depicted in the table below:

Branch network
As of July 2022, the locations of the bank's branches included the following:

 Main Branch - 6 Hannington Road, Kampala
 Kyaggwe Branch - Mukwano Shopping Mall, 23-31 Rashid Khamis Road, Kampala
 Kikuubo Branch - 24 Kikuubo Lane, Kampala
 Acacia Mall Branch - Acacia Shopping Mall, Acacia Avenue, Kololo, Kampala
 Nakawa Branch - Plot 1-2, Enterprise Close, Ntinda Industrial Area, Nakawa Division, Kampala
 Industrial Area Branch - 86-96 Sixth Street, Industrial Area, Kampala
 Kisenyi Branch - Kafumbe Mukasa Road, Kisenyi, Kampala.

Governance 
The Chairperson of the EBU Board is Sarah Nanziri Bagalaaliwo, a non-Executive Director. The Chief Executive Officer is Sabhapathy Krishnan Triplicane, who is a non-shareholder.

See also 

 List of banks in Uganda
 Economy of Uganda
 Banking in Uganda

References

External links
 Website of Exim Bank Uganda
 Website of Bank of Uganda

Banks of Uganda
Foreign trade of Uganda
Banks established in 2011
Companies based in Kampala
2011 establishments in Uganda